Sarayköy is a town and district of Denizli Province in Turkey, 20 km west of the city of Denizli, on a plain between mountains and watered by Büyük Menderes River. The area is around 470 km², and the population (2010) is 29,854 of which 18,510 live in the town of Sarayköy, and the rest in surrounding villages.

Sarayköy is at a high altitude inland from the Mediterranean and thus has hot dry summers and very cold winters. The mountain sides are mostly bare but there are ongoing forestry projects.

History
The town was previously a village named Sarıbey after the Turkmen lord that settled his tribe here in the 14th century.

Sarayköy was an important point of resistance to the Greek Army in the Turkish War of Independence. Volunteers assembled here were able to defend the bridge across the River Menderes and thus prevent the Greeks from occupying the city of Denizli. There is a statue in the town of a fighter in local efe costume to commemorate this struggle.

Sarayköy today
The major activity of the area is textile production (following in the footsteps of nearby Babadağ), mainly weaving but some printing and sewing of bedding and other home textiles.

5,000 homes in the town are heated with water run off from the geothermal power station in the village of Kızıldere, which was the first plant of its kind in Turkey. There are also plants near the power station making dry ice and bottling carbon dioxide. The plain is irrigated and mostly used for growing cotton and there is a large cotton storage and processing plant in the town. Other crops include figs, olives and apricots. Other activities include limestone quarrying and coal mining.

Sarayköy is also a market town for the surrounding countryside.

Places of interest
 The Ahmetli Bridge over the Büyük Menderes river, 15 km from Sarayköy township, dates back to the Roman era. The middle section of the bridge was blown up by the Greek Army as a defensive measure during the Greco-Turkish War but was reconstructed with reinforced concrete later on.

Notable natives
 Sezen Aksu, Turkey's leading modern singer and songwriter was born in Sarayköy.

References

External links
 Thermal Resort & Spa 

Populated places in Denizli Province